The iraimbilanja (singular and plural) is the divisory currency unit of Madagascar, being equal to one fifth of an ariary.

Etymology 
Iraimbilanja means literally "one iron weight" and was the name of an old coin worth  of an ariary.

Value 
The old Malagasy franc is equal in value to one iraimbilanja. As of 1 January 2023 the value of one iraimbilanja is US$0.000044 /¢0.0044.

References 

Currencies of Madagascar